Green County Courthouse may refer to:

Old Courthouse (Greensburg, Kentucky), listed on the National Register of Historic Places. 
Green County Courthouse (Wisconsin), Monroe, Wisconsin

See also
Greene County Courthouse (disambiguation)
Tom Green County Courthouse, San Angelo, Texas